An all-time World Combat Games medal table from 2010 World Combat Games to 2013 World Combat Games.

Medal table

See also
 World Combat Games

References

External links
 
 

World Combat Games
medal table